Lia Sargent is an American voice actress. She is known for extensive anime and video game voice work and has also done ADR directing and script writing for Animaze.. iNC.  She is the daughter of movie and TV director Joseph Sargent and actress Mary Carver.

Notable voice roles

Anime
3x3 Eyes - Meixing Long (Streamline dub)
Ah! My Goddess: The Movie - Morgan le Fay
Ai Yori Aoshi - Miyabi Kagurazaki, Kumi Hojo
Battle Athletes OVA - Jessie Gurtland
Battle Athletes Victory - Akari Kanzaki
The Big O - R. Dorothy Wayneright
Black Magic M-66 - Sybel
Bobobo-bo Bo-bobo - Suzu
Cardcaptor Sakura Movie 2: The Sealed Card - The Nothing Card
Catnapped! - Chuchu
Cosmo Warrior Zero - Marina Oki
Cowboy Bebop - Judy
Cowboy Bebop: The Movie - Judy
Cyborg 009 - Artemis, Sandra (Ep. 29), Vena
El-Hazard - Nanami Jinnai
éX-Driver - Lisa Sakakino
Galerians: Rion - Rita
Gate Keepers - Yukino Hojo
Gate Keepers 21 - Satoka Tachikawa, Yukino Hojo
Ghost in the Shell: S.A.C. 2nd GIG - Tachikoma
Hand Maid May - Cyberdoll May
Kikaider the Animation - Mitsuko Komyoji
Mahoromatic: Automatic Maiden - Yoshimi Tanaka, Sera
Megazone 23 (Streamline dub) - Mai Yumekanou
Mobile Suit Gundam III: Encounters in Space - Lalah Sune
Mobile Suit Gundam 0083: Stardust Memory - Latora
Nightwalker - Mikako, Manami's Mother
Ninja Cadets - Matsuri
Planetes - Claire Rondo
Rurouni Kenshin - Magudaria Sayo
Saber Marionette J Again - Marine
Sakura Wars: The Movie - Kaede Fujieda
Scrapped Princess - Eirote Borchard
Serial Experiments Lain - Chisa Yomoda
Street Fighter II: The Animated Movie - Chun-Li (as Mary Briscoe)
Street Fighter II V (Animaze Dub) - Chun-Li
Street Fighter Alpha: The Animation - Chun-Li
Trigun - Milly Thompson
Vandread: The Second Stage - Misty Cornwell
Wolf's Rain - Neige, Cher's Assistant
X (TV series) - Arashi Kishu
Yu Yu Hakusho: The Movie - Botan (Animaze Dub)
Zenki - Hiroshi, additional voices.

Non-anime
Dead Space: Downfall - Jen Barrow
The Nutcracker and the Mouseking - Clara
Shrek - Additional Voices
Zentrix - Silver General

Games
Brave Fencer Musashi - Bubbles
Gundam Side Story 0079: Rise From the Ashes - Jacqueline
.hack series - Aura, Natsume
Xenosaga Episode I: Der Wille Zur Macht - Shion Uzuki
.hack//G.U. Vol. 2//Reminisce - Sophora
Phase Paradox - Additional voices
Shadow Hearts: Covenant - Saki Inugami
The Bard's Tale - Additional voices
Xenosaga Episode III: Also Sprach Zarathustra - Shion Uzuki

Live action
What the Bleep Do We Know!? - Various Character Voices

Production credits

Voice direction
Battle Athletes Victory
The Big O (season 2)
.hack series
Gate Keepers
Hand Maid May
Perfect Blue
Resident Evil Outbreak File #2
Serial Experiments Lain
Trigun

Script adaptation

The Big O
Mobile Suit Gundam 0080: War in the Pocket
Mobile Suit Gundam 0083: Stardust Memory
Outlaw Star
Perfect Blue
Wolf's Rain

Casting director

Johnson War Country

References

Further reading

External links
Lia Sargent Official Webpage

Lia Sargent Interview at  Anime Dream

Living people
American video game actresses
American voice actresses
American television writers
American women screenwriters
American women television writers
American casting directors
Women casting directors
American voice directors
20th-century American actresses
21st-century American actresses
Screenwriters from California
Year of birth missing (living people)